Church Ball is a 2006 Sports comedy film about a basketball team from a ward of the Church of Jesus Christ of Latter-day Saints (LDS Church).

This family-film and comedy was filmed in and around Provo, Utah and is distributed by Halestorm Entertainment.

Plot
A local Utah LDS Church's holds the record as having the worst basketball team in the church ball league. The team has failed to make it into the church tournament in the past 20 years. Due to rumors of this being the last year of the league, former team coach, and now Bishop Linderman (Fred Willard) has called Dennis Buckstead (Andrew Wilson) to coach a team made of clumsy misfits to the championship.

Church expectations of brotherly love, sportsmanship, and fellowship fall prey to competitive fierceness in the effort to win, while Dennis works to bring unity and cooperation.

Production

The basketball games in the movie were filmed in the Salt Lake Park Stake's Stake Center.

It was also during the filming of this movie that actor Gary Coleman met his wife, Shannon Price. In an interview during an April 2009 broadcast of the Opie and Anthony radio show, Coleman described his dissatisfaction with the film's quality, remarking that watching the production process was like "giving monkeys cameras and lights".

Reception
The review aggregator website Rotten Tomatoes surveyed  and, categorizing the reviews as positive or negative, assessed two as positive and ten as negative for a 17 percent rating. Among the reviews, it determined an average rating of 4.3 out of 10.

References

External links
 

2006 films
Mormon cinema
American basketball films
2000s sports comedy films
American sports comedy films
Christianity and sports
2006 comedy films
Halestorm Entertainment films
2000s English-language films
2000s American films